Departures is a 2011 Turkish short film directed by Ali Y. Akarçeşme. The film is twelve minutes long and is about immigration to the United States from Turkey. In order to raise funds for the film, Akarçeşme held a successful Kickstarter campaign that raised $2,665. Departures was named Best Drama at the Brownfish Short Film Festival in New York City in 2011. And he won the Best Director Award at NY ITN Distribution Film Festival. These awards were the first Akarçeşme received while living in the United States. In 2012, the film was screened at New York's Rushes Soho Shorts Film Festival and the Love Your Shorts Film Festival and competed in the Boston Turkish Film Festival. The film also had official selections in various festivals such as NY Soho International, New Hope, Spain's Renderyard, Buffalo Niagara, NJ's Garden State and more.

References

External links

2011 drama films
Turkish drama films
Turkish short films
2010s English-language films
2010s Turkish-language films
Immigration to the United States
Films about immigration
Kickstarter-funded films
2011 short films
2011 films
2011 multilingual films
Turkish multilingual films